The Campaign for an Independent and Neutral Switzerland ( or AUNS,  or ASIN,  or ASNI), abbreviated to AUNS, is a political organisation in Switzerland that supports Swiss independence and neutrality.

History
The AUNS was founded on June 19, 1986, formed out of the Committee Against UN Membership, shortly after a referendum on UN membership was successfully defeated. Its founders were Christoph Blocher of the SVP and Otto Fischer of the FDP.

Throughout its history, the AUNS has had some success. It successfully opposed referendums on abolishing the military (1989 & 2001), joining the European Economic Area (1992), joining the EU (2001), as well as numerous other referendums. Additionally, the AUNS supported the immigration referendum of 2014, which was narrowly accepted.

On the other hand, its campaigns against the participation of the Swiss Army in armed UN peace-keeping missions (2001), against Swiss succession to the UN (2002), against the bilateral treaties with the European Union (Bilaterale I (2000), Bilaterale II (2004), right to move directive (2004), Schengen treaty (2005)) and against payment of a billion Swiss Francs to the EU Cohesion Fund (2005) were unsuccessful.

As of 2014, the AUNS had 30,100 members, down from 45,000 at the end of 2004. Since April 2014, Lukas Reimann has been the president of AUNS, taking over from Pirmin Schwander.

Organization
While the AUNS describes itself as a non-partisan organization, it has been closely associated with the Swiss People's Party (SVP). It was presided by notable SVP member Christoph Blocher from 1986 to 2003, and is strongly associated with Blocher's rise to a dominating figure in Swiss politics and the rise of right-wing populism orchestrated by SVP campaigns in the 1990s and 2000s.

The AUNS has a youth wing called Youth for an Independent and Neutral Switzerland or JUNS.

Views
According to its website, the AUNS supports Swiss independence, neutrality, and direct democracy. The AUNS stands in opposition to EU membership and NATO membership, involvement of the Swiss military abroad, as well as any loss of Swiss sovereignty.

On its website, the AUNS explicitly distances itself from racism, antisemitism and neo-Nazism, arguing that their ideology is the direct opposite of National Socialism which aimed at an "empire as dictatorship" while their own ideal is "independence, neutrality and direct democracy in Switzerland."

Presidents
Christoph Blocher (1986–2003)
Pirmin Schwander (2004–2014)
Lukas Reimann (2014–present)

See also
 Switzerland–European Union relations

References

External links 
 
 Official website for youth wing

 
Conservatism in Switzerland
Euroscepticism in Switzerland
1986 establishments in Switzerland
Foreign relations of Switzerland
Politics of Switzerland
Swiss nationalism
Think tanks based in Switzerland